"French Foreign Legion" is a popular song.
The music was written by Guy Wood, the lyrics by Aaron Schroeder. The song was published in 1958. It is best known in a version recorded by Frank Sinatra on 29 Dec 1958, released as a single and which appears on the albums All The Way and early UK stereo releases of Come Fly with Me.

References

Songs about the military
Songs written by Aaron Schroeder
1958 songs
Frank Sinatra songs
Songs written by Guy Wood
French Foreign Legion in popular culture